Coleotechnites occidentis is a moth of the family Gelechiidae. It is found in North America, where it has been recorded from British Columbia.

The wingspan is 9–11 mm. The forewings are white with ochreous scales scattered in the outer three-fourths. The hindwings are grey.

The larvae feed on Juniperus scopulorum. They mine the leaves and stem of their host plant. The mine starts at the tip a branchlet, in the direction of the base. The species overwinters in the mine and continues mining in spring.

References

Moths described in 1965
Coleotechnites